During the 2010–11 season, Sunderland A.F.C. (the professional association football club representing the aforementioned city) competed in the Premier League.

Results

Pre-season

Premier League

League table

League Cup

FA Cup

Statistics

Discipline

Overall

Goal scorers

Appearances and goals
Last updated on 22 May 2011.

|}
 Left club during season

First-team squad

Transfers

In

Out

Awards

See also
Sunderland A.F.C. seasons

Notes

References

Sunderland A.F.C. seasons
Sunderland